The 2001 Rice Owls football team represented Rice University in the 2001 NCAA Division I-A college football season. The Owls, led by head coach Ken Hatfield, played their home games at Rice Stadium in Houston, Texas.

Schedule

References

Rice Owls football
Rice
Rice Owls football seasons